Johnson County is a county located in the U.S. state of Kentucky. As of the 2020 census, the population was 22,680. Its county seat is Paintsville. The county was formed in 1843 and named for Richard Mentor Johnson, War of 1812 general, United States Representative, Senator, and Vice President of the United States. Johnson County is classified as a moist county, which is a county in which alcohol sales are not allowed (a dry county), but containing a "wet" city, in this case Paintsville, where alcoholic beverage sales are allowed.

History

Formation
Johnson County was formed on February 24, 1843, by the Kentucky General Assembly from land given by Floyd, Lawrence, and Morgan counties.  At that time, its county seat of Paintsville had already been a chartered city for nine years.  Homes had been built in Paintsville as early as the 1810s.

Many of the families at the beginning of Johnson County's formation were of Scottish, Irish, English, or German descent.  Also, a fact lost to most historians is the large population of French Huguenots who were confused as English because they fled via England en route to the United States. Many of these settlers migrated from North Carolina, Pennsylvania, and Virginia following their participation in the Revolutionary War.

For about its first twenty-five years, Johnson County and Paintsville struggled along.  Roads and highways were nonexistent.  Mail and supplies reached Johnson County from the Bluegrass region by horseback and steamboat.  Years later, stage coaches began to connect eastern Kentucky and Johnson County to the bluegrass region and the rest of civilization.

Civil War era
As Johnson County and its county seat had begun to thrive, in 1860 the Civil War became a disrupter.  Like other border areas, brothers fought against brothers, tearing families apart.  Johnson County was not only part of a border state during the Civil War, but it was a border county as well.

Sometime between 1860 and 1862, the county enacted an ordinance that neither the Union or Confederate flags were to be flown within the county.  This was repealed quickly after Colonel James Garfield's Union brigade marched through Paintsville on its way to defeat the Confederate cavalry at the Battle of Middle Creek in Floyd County.

John C. C. Mayo
Following the Civil War, Thomas Jefferson Mayo moved to Paintsville to fulfill a role as a gifted and talented teacher.  He fathered John C. C. Mayo, an important figure in the development of eastern Kentucky.  The county citizenry is divided on their loyalty to his memory.  Some would say he was a benefactor who assisted in the development of Paintsville, and as a result, Johnson County.  That he helped develop banks, churches, streets, public utilities and railroad transportation. Others would say he was directly responsible for the huge influence coal companies had over the county's vast coal resources and the reason the region remains so economically depressed to this day.

 Coal was important for Johnson County and the rest of eastern Kentucky even before the Civil War, but its development halted at the start of the war. Financing was slow to return to the coal industry in eastern Kentucky and this inhibited development in Johnson County. The people were suspicious of outsiders and Mayo, a school teacher, was a known quantity and one of their own.  So he was invaluable in helping the coal industry to gain a firm foothold in the coal fields of eastern Kentucky and to the industrialized north which spurred the development of railroads in the area.  Carpetbaggers from the North became a common sight in the area.  It was during this time that many of the citizens of Johnson County were given misleading information and sold all mineral rights to their property for pennies on the dollar of what the rights were worth. In some cases, for a new shotgun. It was also during this time that many people lost their property due to a strange rash of fires in several county seats, destroying deeds and records of ownership, which paved the way for land-grabbers to take what the owners did not want to relinquish.

The Chesapeake and Ohio Railway first opened its Paintsville depot on September 1, 1904, following 25 years of work connecting it to Lawrence County. The rails were paid for by donations, stocks and bonds, and the hard work of local citizens. History shows that the rail companies leaked information and frequently changed planned routes to create bidding wars and to finance the rails.  Following the development of the railroad, tens of thousands of tons of coal were being transported out of eastern Kentucky by 1910.

Mayo went on to be a political lobbyist, and eastern Kentucky's only member of the Democratic National Committee.  He had influence in electing Kentucky's governors, members of Congress and the election of President Woodrow Wilson.

He died on May 11, 1914, after becoming ill following a trip to Europe.  During his life, he built a historic mansion in Paintsville which has become known as Mayo Mansion.

Geography

The county's highest point is Stuffley Knob, with an elevation of 1,496 feet (456 m). Its lowest point is the Levisa Fork on the Lawrence County border, with an elevation of about 550 feet (168 m).

Adjacent counties
 Lawrence County  (north)
 Martin County  (east)
 Floyd County  (south)
 Magoffin County  (southwest)
 Morgan County  (northwest)

Transportation

Major highways
  U.S. Route 23
  U.S. Route 460
  Kentucky Route 40
  Kentucky Route 321
  Kentucky Route 3

Air
Big Sandy Regional Airport, located in adjacent Martin County, is the nearest airport. It is used as a general aviation airport.

Demographics

As of the census of 2000, there were 23,445 people, 9,103 households, and 6,863 families residing in the county. The racial makeup of the county was 98.64% White, 0.25% Black or African American, 0.13% Native American, 0.29% Asian, 0.02% Pacific Islander, 0.09% from other races, and 0.58% from two or more races.  0.61% of the population were Hispanic or Latino of any race.

There were 9,103 households, out of which 34.10% had children under the age of 18 living with them, 60.50% were married couples living together, 11.30% had a female householder with no husband present, and 24.60% were non-families. 22.30% of all households were made up of individuals, and 9.00% had someone living alone who was 65 years of age or older.  The average household size was 2.52 and the average family size was 2.93.

In the county, the population was spread out, with 24.00% under the age of 18, 8.80% from 18 to 24, 28.90% from 25 to 44, 25.70% from 45 to 64, and 12.60% who were 65 years of age or older.  The median age was 37 years. For every 100 females there were 93.10 males.  For every 100 females age 18 and over, there were 90.70 males.

The median income for a household in the county was $24,911, and the median income for a family was $29,142. Males had a median income of $29,762 versus $20,136 for females. The per capita income for the county was $14,051.  About 21.70% of families and 26.60% of the population were below the poverty line, including 35.50% of those under age 18 and 19.30% of those age 65 or over.

Government
 County Judge/Executive: Mark McKenzie
 Commissioner District 1: Kathy Adams
 Commissioner District 2: Mike Jarrell
 Commissioner District 3: Tim Salyer
 County Attorney: Michael S. Endicott
 County Court Clerk: Sallee Holbrook
 Circuit Court Clerk: Penny Adams Castle
 PVA: Michael "Dip" Stafford
 Sheriff: Doug Saylor
 Jailer: Steve Rose
 Coroner: J.R. Frisby
 Constable District 1: James Castle
 Constable District 2: Bruce Ritz
 Constable District 3: David Pridemore
 County Surveyor: Clarence Scarberry

Politics
Johnson County is at present and historically a powerfully Republican county. No Democrat has ever won a majority of the county's vote since at least 1880, though Bill Clinton did gain narrow pluralities in 1992 and 1996, and Lyndon Johnson lost to Barry Goldwater by a mere twenty-two votes in 1964.

Education

Public
Johnson County is home to two public school districts.

Johnson County Schools

The Johnson County School District, which operates schools throughout the county, including the city of Paintsville, operates the following schools:

Porter Elementary, W.R. Castle Elementary, Highland Elementary, Flat Gap Elementary, Central Elementary, Johnson County Middle School, and Johnson Central High School.

Central Elementary was ranked top-performing elementary school in 5-6 statewide CTBS/CATS testing. Central Elementary was also the top-performing elementary school (based on national CTBS testing) in the Southeastern US.

Johnson County Middle School's academic team has won the most State Governor's Cups. It has won the Cup in 1999, 2000, 2004, 2006, 2007, 2008, 2009, 2010, 2012, 2013, and 2014. It has won numerous state Quick Recall awards and its Future Problem Solving team has won state and international awards and acclaim.

Johnson Central High School performs well in various areas and is well known statewide for their academic, football, and basketball teams. The high school was recently named a U.S. News & World Report Top American High School, being given a bronze award. Also, the school recently became WSAZ's first 'Cool School'. Johnson Central High school is considered a "powerhouse" in the high school Quick Recall scene, starting with the 1994–1995 season. They are also noted as a well-performing national quiz bowl competitor. Their football team, coached by Jim Matney,  has been noted for their up-and-coming program and very successful seasons.  They have advanced to the 4A State Championship game 5 consecutive times, from 2015 to 2019. In 2016 and 2019 the Golden Eagles won 2 State Championships, by defeating Franklin-Simpson High School, 48-0 and state power Boyle County 21–20. The basketball team is coached by Tommy McKenzie who has led the Eagles to the Kentucky High School Athletic Association Sweet 16 (KHSAA) State basketball tournament 5 times. Coach Jim Matney was named the 2019 (NFHS) National HS Wrestling Coach of the year after leading the Eagles to 11 straight Regional Championships and JCs first ever State Dual Meet Championship in 2019  Johnson Central offers many clubs including STLP, FBLA, DECA, Beta, FFA, HOSA, SkillsUSA and FCCLA. Johnson Central is also home to a new Career Technology Center.

Paintsville Independent Schools

The Paintsville Independent School District also operates two schools: Paintsville Elementary School, a K-6 facility, and the 7-12 Paintsville High School. Paintsville High also has earned numerous sport titles .  The school has won boys' state championships in golf, baseball and basketball and made it to the finals of the state football playoffs. Note that in Kentucky, the only sports in which schools are divided into enrollment classes are football, cross-country and track.

Both the Johnson County and Paintsville Independent districts met all of the No Child Left Behind standards set by the national government.

Private

Two private schools also operate in the county: Our Lady of the Mountain School (K-8) and Johnson County Christian School.

Colleges
 Big Sandy Community and Technical College manages two campuses in Johnson County: Mayo and Hager Hill.

Attractions

Kentucky Apple Festival
In the same year as Mayo's death (1914), the first county fair was held in Paintsville, where the first Apple King was also crowned.

In 1962, Johnson County hosted the first Kentucky Apple Festival, which has been held annually in Paintsville since.  The streets of downtown Paintsville are closed to vehicular traffic and festivities to include live music and entertainment, along with various competitions.

Parks and recreation
Paintsville Lake State Park

This scenic state park contains a  lake, a  wildlife management area, a marina, a 4 lane boat dock, a restaurant, a convenience store, boat rentals, multiple picnic shelters, playgrounds, and both developed and primitive camp sites. It is located on route 2275 at Staffordsville, just a few miles out of Paintsville.

Paintsville Recreation Center
The Paintsville Recreation Center contains a basketball court, a playground, and a volleyball court. Located on Preston Street in Paintsville.

Paintsville Country Club & Golf Course

This 18-hole golf course was established on September 27, 1929, making it one of the oldest golf courses in Eastern Kentucky. The country club was built in 1930 by the WPA and is on the National Register of Historic Places. Located on Kentucky Route 1107 in Paintsville.

Museums

U.S. 23 Country Music Highway Museum

This museum has many exhibits that tell the stories of the country music stars that grew up near U.S. Route 23 in Eastern Kentucky. Located at 120 Staves Branch in Paintsville.

The Coal Miners' Museum

This museum tells the history of the local area's coal mining industry. Located on Millers Creek Road in Van Lear.

Historical sites
Mayo Mansion

This 43-room mansion was built by John C. C. Mayo between 1905 and 1912 and now serves as Our Lady of the Mountains School. Located on Third Street in Paintsville.

Mayo Memorial United Methodist Church

The church was also constructed by John C. C. Mayo, who hired 100 Masons from Italy to construct it. The church has an organ donated by Andrew Carnegie and has several large stained glass windows. The church opened in the fall of 1909. Located on Third Street in Paintsville, beside Mayo Mansion.

Jenny Wiley Gravesite
Jenny Wiley is a historical figure who was captured by Native Americans in Virginia. After she escaped captivity, she reunited with her husband and lived in Johnson County until her death in 1831. Her grave is located just off Highway 581 at River.

Points of interest
Loretta Lynn Homeplace

Childhood home of country music superstar, Loretta Lynn Located at Butcher Hollow in Van Lear.

Forrest and Maxie Preston Memorial Bridge
This  pedestrian only swinging bridge is the world's longest plastic bridge. The deck of the bridge is made of glass fiber-reinforced polymer. It crosses the Levisa Fork of the Big Sandy River and connects the communities of River and Offutt. Located on Kentucky Route 581 at River.

Mountain Homeplace

The Mountain Homeplace gives a unique look at a replica of an Eastern Kentucky farming community from the mid-nineteenth century. It contains a one-room schoolhouse, a church, a blacksmith shop, a cabin, a barn, and farm grounds. There are also demonstrations of old time skills and crafts. It is located near the dam at Paintsville Lake State Park.

Miscellaneous
Johnson County is also the former home of the Enterprise Association of Regular Baptists, which was organized on October 26, 1894, at Enterprise (now known as Redbush), Kentucky. The association now resides at 1560 Nibert Road, Gallipolis, Ohio, 45631.

Communities

City
 Paintsville

Unincorporated communities

 Asa
 Boonscamp
 Chandlerville
 Collista
 Denver
 Dobson
 East Point
 Elna
 Flat Gap
 Fuget
 Hager Hill
 Hargis
 Keaton
 Kerz
 Leander
 Low Gap
 Manila
 Meally
 Nero
 Nippa
 Odds
 Offutt
 Oil Springs
 Redbush
 River
 Riceville
 Sip
 Sitka
 Staffordsville
 Stambaugh
 Swamp Branch
 Thealka
 Thelma
 Tutor Key
 Van Lear
 Volga
 West Van Lear
 Whitehouse
 Williamsport
 Winifred
 Wittensville

Notable residents
 Loretta Lynn, legendary country singer. The title song on her 2004 album, Van Lear Rose, references her upbringing in the city of Van Lear located in Johnson County.
 Tyler Childers, singer-songwriter.  Went to Paintsville High School.
 Crystal Gayle, country singer and younger sister of Loretta Lynn.
 Chris Stapleton, Grammy award-winning country musician
 Jenny Wiley, held captive by Native Americans.
 John C. C. Mayo, entrepreneur, assisted in bringing railroad service to eastern Kentucky.
 Jim Ford, singer-songwriter
 Hylo Brown, bluegrass and country music singer
 Johnnie LeMaster, former major league baseball player primarily with the San Francisco Giants
 John Pelphrey, basketball standout for University of Kentucky, and former University of Arkansas head basketball coach
 Willie Blair, former Major League Baseball player

See also
 Big Sandy Area Development District
 Citizens National Bank
 Johnson County Public Library
 National Register of Historic Places listings in Johnson County, Kentucky
 Paintsville-Prestonsburg Combs Field
 Paul B. Hall Regional Medical Center
 Francis M. Stafford House

References

External links
 Johnson County Fiscal Court
 WSIP radio
 WKLW radio
 Paintsville/Johnson County Chamber of Commerce
 Paintsville Tourism
 Johnson County Public Schools
 The Paintsville Herald
 History of Johnson County
 Kentucky Apple Festival
 Johnson County Public Library
 Paintsville Golf Course

 
Kentucky counties
1843 establishments in Kentucky
Populated places established in 1843
Counties of Appalachia